Gordon Hill is a retired  American football safety. He played college football at Sacred Heart. He was signed by the San Diego Chargers as an undrafted free agent in 2015. He is currently the cornerbacks coach for Sacred Heart University.

Hill grew up in Winslow Township, New Jersey and played high school football at St. Joseph High School.

Professional career

San Diego Chargers
On May 2, 2016, the San Diego Chargers signed Hill to a free agent contract. Hill saw action in the Chargers' first two preseason games, accounting for a tackle in a 17–7 win over the Dallas Cowboys on August 13, and an assisted tackle in a 22–19 victory over the Arizona Cardinals on August 22. On September 1, 2016, the Chargers waived Hill due to roster cuts.

References

External links
Sacred Heart bio
San Diego Chargers bio

1993 births
Living people
American football safeties
People from Winslow Township, New Jersey
Players of American football from New Jersey
Sportspeople from Camden County, New Jersey
San Diego Chargers players
St. Joseph Academy (New Jersey) alumni
Sacred Heart Pioneers football players